The following is an alphabetical list of articles related to Alaska.

0–9 
 .ak.us – Internet second-level domain for the state of Alaska
 49th State to join the United States of America
 54°40′ parallel north
 100 km isolated peaks of Alaska
 100Stone
 141st meridian west
 1500 meter prominent peaks of Alaska
 4000 meter peaks of Alaska

A 
 Adjacent province and territory:
 
 
 Agriculture in Alaska
 :Category:Agriculture in Alaska
 Airports in Alaska
 AK – United States Postal Service postal code for the state of Alaska
 Alaska  website
 :Category:Alaska
 commons:Category:Alaska
 commons:Category:Maps of Alaska
 Alaska 1741–1953
 Alaska Immigration Justice Project
 Alaska lunar sample displays
 Alaska Purchase of 1867
 Alaska State Capitol
 Alaska State Troopers
 Alaska Territorial Guard
 Anchorage, Alaska
 Aquaria in Alaska
 commons:Category:Aquaria in Alaska
 Archaeology in Alaska
 :Category:Archaeological sites in Alaska
 commons:Category:Archaeological sites in Alaska
 Architecture in Alaska
 Area codes in Alaska
 Art museums and galleries in Alaska
 commons:Category:Art museums and galleries in Alaska
 Astronomical observatories in Alaska
 commons:Category:Astronomical observatories in Alaska
 Athletes from Alaska
 Spanish expeditions to the Pacific Northwest, 1744–1792

B 
 Barrow Area Information Database
 Battle of the Aleutian Islands, 1942–1943
 Botanical gardens in Alaska
 commons:Category:Botanical gardens in Alaska
 Boroughs and census areas of the state of Alaska
 commons:Category:Boroughs in Alaska
 Buildings and structures in Alaska
 commons:Category:Buildings and structures in Alaska

C 
 Capital of the State of Alaska
 Capitol of the State of Alaska
 commons:Category:Alaska State Capitol
 Census statistical areas of Alaska
 Cities in Alaska
 commons:Category:Cities in Alaska
 Climate of Alaska
 :Category:Climate of Alaska
 commons:Category:Climate of Alaska
 Climate change in Alaska 
 Colleges and universities in Alaska
 commons:Category:Universities and colleges in Alaska
 Coming into the Country – a 1976 nonfiction book by John McPhee
 Communications in Alaska
 commons:Category:Communications in Alaska
 Companies in Alaska
 :Category:Companies based in Alaska
 Constitution of the State of Alaska
 Culture of Alaska
 :Category:Alaska culture
 commons:Category:Alaska culture

D 
 Demographics of Alaska
 :Category:Demographics of Alaska
 Department of Alaska, 1867–1884
 District of Alaska, 1884–1912

E 
 Economy of Alaska
 :Category:Economy of Alaska
 commons:Category:Economy of Alaska
 Education in Alaska
 :Category:Education in Alaska
 commons:Category:Education in Alaska
 Elections in the state of Alaska
 :Category:Alaska elections
 commons:Category:Alaska elections
 Energy in Alaska
 :Category:Energy in Alaska
 Environment of Alaska
 commons:Category:Environment of Alaska
 Exxon Valdez oil spill of 1989

F 
 Festivals in Alaska
 commons:Category:Festivals in Alaska
 Fjords of Alaska
 commons:Category:Fjords of Alaska
 Flag of the state of Alaska
 Flora of Alaska
 Forts in Alaska
 :Category:Forts in Alaska
 commons:Category:Forts in Alaska

G 
 Gardening in Alaska
 Geography of Alaska
 :Category:Geography of Alaska
 commons:Category:Geography of Alaska
 Geology of Alaska
 commons:Category:Geology of Alaska
 Ghost towns in Alaska
 :Category:Ghost towns in Alaska
 commons:Category:Ghost towns in Alaska
 Glaciers of Alaska
 Gold mining in Alaska
 Good Friday earthquake of 1964
 Government of the state of Alaska  website
 :Category:Government of Alaska
 commons:Category:Government of Alaska
 Governor of the State of Alaska
 List of governors of Alaska
 Great Seal of the State of Alaska

H 
 Heritage railroads in Alaska
 commons:Category:Heritage railroads in Alaska
 High schools of Alaska
 Higher education in Alaska
 Highest major peaks of Alaska
 Highway routes in Alaska
 Hiking trails in Alaska
 commons:Category:Hiking trails in Alaska
 History of Alaska
 Historical outline of Alaska
 :Category:History of Alaska
 commons:Category:History of Alaska
 Hospitals in Alaska
 Hot springs of Alaska
 commons:Category:Hot springs of Alaska
 House of Representatives of the State of Alaska

I 
 Images of Alaska
 commons:Category:Alaska
 Islands of Alaska

J 
 Juneau, Alaska, capital of Alaska since 1906

K 
Kiska

L 
 Lakes in Alaska
 commons:Category:Lakes of Alaska
 Landmarks in Alaska
 commons:Category:Landmarks in Alaska
 Languages of Alaska
 Lieutenant Governor of the State of Alaska
 Lists related to the state of Alaska:
 List of airports in Alaska
 List of athletes from Alaska
 List of birds of Aleutian Islands
 List of census statistical areas in Alaska
 List of cities in Alaska
 List of colleges and universities in Alaska
 List of companies in Alaska
 List of counties in Alaska
 List of forts in Alaska
 List of ghost towns in Alaska
 List of governors of Alaska
 List of high schools in Alaska
 List of highway routes in Alaska
 List of hospitals in Alaska
 List of islands of Alaska
 List of law enforcement agencies in Alaska
 List of lieutenant governors of Alaska
 List of mountains of Alaska
 List of 4000 meter peaks of Alaska
 List of mountain peaks of Alaska
 List of museums in Alaska
 List of National Historic Landmarks in Alaska
 List of National Parks in Alaska
 List of people from Alaska
 List of places in Alaska
 List of power stations in Alaska
 List of radio stations in Alaska
 List of railroads in Alaska
 List of Registered Historic Places in Alaska
 List of rivers in Alaska
 List of school districts in Alaska
 List of state forests in Alaska
 List of state parks in Alaska
 List of state prisons in Alaska
 List of state symbols of Alaska
 List of telephone area codes in Alaska
 List of television stations in Alaska
 List of towns in Alaska
 List of United States congressional delegations from Alaska
 List of United States congressional district of Alaska
 List of United States representatives from Alaska
 List of United States senators from Alaska

M 
 Maps of Alaska
 commons:Category:Maps of Alaska
 Mass media in Alaska
 Mountain peaks of Alaska
 The 50 Highest major peaks of Alaska
 The 20 4000 meter peaks of Alaska
 The 50 Most prominent peaks of Alaska
 The 65 Ultra prominent peaks of Alaska
 The 50 Most isolated major peaks of Alaska
 The 38 100 km isolated peaks of Alaska
 :Category:Mountains of Alaska
 commons:Category:Mountains of Alaska
 Museums in Alaska
 :Category:Museums in Alaska
 commons:Category:Museums in Alaska
 Music of Alaska
 :Category:Music of Alaska
 commons:Category:Music of Alaska
 :Category:Musical groups from Alaska
 :Category:Musicians from Alaska

N 
 National Forests of Alaska
 commons:Category:National Forests of Alaska
 National Monuments of Alaska
 commons:Category:National Monuments of Alaska
 Natural gas in Alaska
 Natural history of Alaska
 commons:Category:Natural history of Alaska
 Newspapers of Alaska
 Novo-Arkhangelsk, capital of Russian Alaska 1808–1867

O 
 Outside (Alaska) — common Alaska term for a non-Alaskan location

P 
 Parallel 54°40′ north
 People from Alaska
 :Category:People from Alaska
 commons:Category:People from Alaska
 :Category:People by city in Alaska
 :Category:People from Alaska by occupation
 Places in Alaska
 Politics of Alaska
 :Category:Politics of Alaska
 commons:Category:Politics of Alaska
 Power cost equalization
 Power stations in Alaska
 Prehistory of Alaska
 Protected areas of Alaska
 commons:Category:Protected areas of Alaska

Q 
 Quinhagak, Alaska
 Quinn-Davidson, Austin

R 
 Radio stations in Alaska
 Railroads in Alaska
 Registered historic places in Alaska
 commons:Category:Registered Historic Places in Alaska
 Religion in Alaska
 :Category:Religion in Alaska
 commons:Category:Religion in Alaska
 Rivers of Alaska
 commons:Category:Rivers of Alaska
 Russian Alaska, 1741–1867

S 
 Scouting in Alaska
 Settlements in Alaska
 Cities in Alaska
 Census Designated Places in Alaska
 Other unincorporated communities in Alaska
 List of ghost towns in Alaska
 List of places in Alaska
 Sitka, Alaska, capital of Alaska 1808–1906
 Ski areas and resorts in Alaska
 commons:Category:Ski areas and resorts in Alaska
 Solar power in Alaska
 Spanish expeditions to Alaska
 Sports in Alaska
 commons:Category:Sports in Alaska
 Sports venues in Alaska
 commons:Category:Sports venues in Alaska
 State Capitol of Alaska
 State of Alaska  website
 Constitution of the State of Alaska
 Government of the state of Alaska
 :Category:Government of Alaska
 commons:Category:Government of Alaska
 Executive branch of the government of the state of Alaska
 Governor of the State of Alaska
 Legislative branch of the government of the State of Alaska
 Legislature of the State of Alaska
 Senate of the State of Alaska
 House of Representatives of the State of Alaska
 Judicial branch of the government of the State of Alaska
 Supreme Court of the State of Alaska
 State parks of Alaska
 commons:Category:State parks of Alaska
 State prisons of Alaska
 Structures in Alaska
 commons:Category:Buildings and structures in Alaska
 Superfund sites in Alaska
 Supreme Court of the State of Alaska
 Symbols of the State of Alaska
 :Category:Symbols of Alaska
 commons:Category:Symbols of Alaska

T 
 Telecommunications in Alaska
 commons:Category:Communications in Alaska
 Telephone area codes in Alaska
 Television shows set in Alaska
 Television stations in Alaska
 Territory of Alaska, 1912–1959
 Theatres in Alaska
 commons:Category:Theatres in Alaska
 Tourism in Alaska  website
 commons:Category:Tourism in Alaska
 Towns in Alaska
 commons:Category:Cities in Alaska
 Transportation in Alaska
 :Category:Transportation in Alaska
 commons:Category:Transport in Alaska

U 
 Ultra prominent peaks of Alaska
 United States of America
 States of the United States of America
 United States census statistical areas of Alaska
 United States congressional delegations from Alaska
 United States congressional district of Alaska
 United States Court of Appeals for the Ninth Circuit
 United States District Court for the District of Alaska
 United States representatives from Alaska
 United States senators from Alaska
 Universities and colleges in Alaska
 commons:Category:Universities and colleges in Alaska
 US-AK – ISO 3166-2:US region code for the State of Alaska

V 
Vaccinate Alaska Coalition
VacTrAK

W 
 Waterfalls of Alaska
 :Category:Waterfalls of Alaska
 commons:Category:Waterfalls of Alaska
Wikimedia
 Wikimedia Commons:Category:Alaska
 commons:Category:Maps of Alaska
 Wikinews:Category:Alaska
 Wikinews:Portal:Alaska
 Wikipedia Category:Alaska
 Wikipedia Portal:Alaska
 Wikipedia:WikiProject Alaska
 :Category:WikiProject Alaska articles
 Wikipedia:WikiProject Alaska/Participants
 Wildlife of Alaska
 Wind power in Alaska

X

Y 
York, Alaska
Yakutat Airport
Yakutat, Alaska

Z 
 Zoos in Alaska
 commons:Category:Zoos in Alaska

See also 

Topic overview:
Alaska
Outline of Alaska

+
 Index
Indexes of topics by U.S. state